National Highway 701, commonly referred to as NH 701 is a national highway in  India. It is a spur road of National Highway 1. NH-701 traverses the union territory of Jammu and Kashmir in India.

Route description 
Baramulla - Rafiabad - Kupwara - Tangdhar .

Major intersections 

  Terminal near Baramula.

See also 

 List of National Highways in India
 List of National Highways in India by state

References

External links 

 NH 701 on OpenStreetMap

National highways in India
National Highways in Jammu and Kashmir
Transport in Baramulla